The 2009 ATP Studena Croatia Open Umag was a tennis tournament played on outdoor red clay courts. It was the 20th edition of the event known that year as the ATP Studena Croatia Open Umag and was part of the ATP World Tour 250 series of the 2009 ATP World Tour. It took place at the International Tennis Center in Umag, Croatia, from 27 July through 2 August 2009. First-seeded Nikolay Davydenko won the singles title.

Entrants

Seeds

*Seedings based on the July 20, 2009 rankings.

Other entrants
The following players received wildcards into the singles main draw
  Ivan Dodig
  Blaž Kavčič
  Filippo Volandri

The following players received entry from the qualifying draw:
  Marcel Granollers
  Rubén Ramírez Hidalgo
  Martin Kližan
  Juan Ignacio Chela

Finals

Singles

 Nikolay Davydenko defeated  Juan Carlos Ferrero, 6–3, 6–0.
 It was Davydenko's second title of the year and 16th of his career.

Doubles

 František Čermák /  Michal Mertiňák defeated  Johan Brunström /  Jean-Julien Rojer, 6–4, 6–4.

Notes

 Players' rankings, as of Monday, July 20, 2009.
 Projected seeding based on the Monday, July 20, 2009, rankings.

References

External links
 Official website